Muslim Council may refer to:


Europe
 Central Council of Ex-Muslims, in Germany
 French Council of the Muslim Faith, founded 2003 by Nicolas Sarkozy
 Muslim Council for Cooperation in Europe, based in Strasbourg, France
 Muslim Council of Sweden, founded 1990

United Kingdom
 Muslim Council of Britain,  founded 1997
 Sufi Muslim Council, founded 2006

United States
 American Muslim Council, based in Chicago
 Indian American Muslim Council
 Muslim American Public Affairs Council, based in Raleigh, North Carolina
 Muslim Public Affairs Council, based in Los Angeles

Other places
 Muslim Council of NSW, Sydney, Australia
 National Muslim Council of Tanzania
 Supreme Muslim Council, historical body in charge of Muslim community affairs in Palestine under British control

See also
 Australian Federation of Islamic Councils, a Sunni umbrella body for state organisations, including
 Islamic Council of Queensland, Australia
 Islamic Council of Victoria, Australia
 Islamic Council Norway
 Islamic Council of Herat, Afghanistan